Triphysa dohrnii is a butterfly of the family Nymphalidae. It is found in Russia (the southern Altai Mountains, Tuva, Transbaikalia), north-western China and Mongolia. Seitz dohrni Z., has a broader, more whitish metallic margin than phryne.  The habitat consists of mountainous steppe up to altitudes of 2,400 meters.

Adults are on wing from June to July.

Subspecies
Triphysa dohrnii dohrnii (Transbaikalia and the Amur region)
Triphysa dohrnii glacialis Bang-Haas, 1912 (Sayan)

References

Butterflies described in 1850
Butterflies of Asia
Satyrini